This is a list of active ships of the Brazilian Navy, complete and correct . The Navy has approximately 134 ships in commission, including 39 auxiliary ships. 8 frigates/corvettes, 7 conventional attack submarines and 1 helicopter carrier.

Current ships

Submarines

Helicopter carrier

Amphibious warfare

Major surface combatants

Offshore patrol

Mine countermeasures

Auxiliary

Landing craft

Survey

Inshore patrol

Training

Fast interdiction boats / Port captaincy

Silhouettes 
Silhouettes of major units in service or planned:

Future ships 

The following ships are under construction, planned, or desired.

Torpedoes, missiles and cannons

Current

Future

Historic ships

Imperial Navy

Some Vessels of the Imperial Navy

maRepublic Navy

See also 
Currently active military equipment by country

References 

 
Brazilian Navy Ships